Topelia is a genus of fungi within the family Stictidaceae.

The genus name of Topelia is an anagram in honour of Josef Poelt (1924-1995), who was a German-Austrian botanist (Bryology, Mycology and Lichenology) and was Professor of Systematic Botany at the Free University of Berlin in 1965.

The genus was circumscribed by Per Magnus Jørgensen and Antonin Vězda in Nova Hedwigia Beih. vol.79 on page 502 in 1984.

Species
As accepted by Species Fungorum;
 Topelia aperiens 
 Topelia argentinensis 
 Topelia brittonii 
 Topelia californica 
 Topelia gyalectodes 
 Topelia heterospora 
 Topelia jasonhurii 
 Topelia loekoesiana 
 Topelia nimisiana 
 Topelia rosea 
 Topelia tetraspora

References

Ostropales
Lichen genera
Ostropales genera
Taxa named by Antonín Vězda
Taxa named by Per Magnus Jørgensen